Oujon Charterhouse was a Carthusian monastery or charterhouse near Arzier-Le Muids in the canton of Vaud, Switzerland, founded in 1146/49 and dissolved in 1537.  It is a cultural property of national significance (class A).

Priors 

 Hugo (before 1185)
 Guigo (1195)
 Gaucher (1210)

References 

Carthusian monasteries in Switzerland
Buildings and structures in the canton of Vaud